Vital Signs 2 was  the second album of the Pakistani band Vital Signs released in 1991.

Track listing
All music composed by Vital Signs. All songs written by Shoaib Mansoor.

Personnel
All information is taken from the CD.

Vital Signs
Junaid Jamshed Khan - vocals
Rohail Hyatt - keyboard, backing vocals
Shehzad Hasan - bass guitars
Rizwan-ul-Haq - lead guitars

Production
Produced by Rohail Hyatt
Recorded, Mixed & Mastered at EMI Studios in Karachi, Pakistan

External links
Vital Signs - A Personal History by NFP
Vital Signs 2nd album

1991 albums
Vital Signs (band) albums
Urdu-language albums